Common names: Central American jumping pitviper.

Metlapilcoatlus mexicanus is a venomous pitviper species endemic to Mexico and Central America.

Description
 Adults grow to an average of 50–70 cm (about 20-28 inches) in total length. The body is extremely stout.

Geographic range
Found in the Atlantic drainage from Mexico (in the Mexican states of Tabasco and Chiapas) south to the Canal Zone in Panama, both slopes of Costa Rica and Panama. The type locality given is "Coban, capitale de la province de la Véra-Paz, (République de Guatemala, Amérique centrale)" (Cobán, Alta Verapaz, Guatemala).

Taxonomy
Regarded as a full species, Metlapilcoatlus mexicanus, by Campbell and Lamar (2004).

References

External links
 

mexicanus
Reptiles of Mexico
Snakes of Central America
Reptiles of Guatemala
Reptiles described in 1854
Taxa named by André Marie Constant Duméril
Taxa named by Gabriel Bibron
Taxa named by Auguste Duméril
Taxobox binomials not recognized by IUCN